A Private State (1997) is a collection of short stories by Charlotte Bacon. It won the Ernest Hemingway Foundation/PEN Award (1998), and the Associated Writing Programs Award for Short Fiction (1996). A story from the collection "Live Free or Die," won the 1996 Pirate's Alley Faulkner Society Award for Best Short Story.

Reception
Writing in the New York Times Book Review, Lisa Zeidner, a professor of English at Rutgers University, said:
Bacon is attempting to produce exciting fiction about essentially unexciting and predictable lives -- a surprisingly difficult task. It's hard to get the balance right between dailiness and drama. Readers may occasionally wish that these women and Bacon's stories took more chances. She often succeeds.

Editions
Charlette Bacon. A Private State, University of Massachusetts Press, 1997.

References

1997 short story collections
American short story collections
University of Massachusetts Press books
Hemingway Foundation/PEN Award-winning works